The 1916 Exeter by-election was held on 7 August 1916.  The by-election was held due to the incumbent Conservative MP, Henry Duke, becoming Chief Secretary for Ireland.  It was retained by Duke, who was unopposed due to the war-time electoral pact.

1916 elections in the United Kingdom
1916 in England
20th century in Exeter
Elections in Exeter
By-elections to the Parliament of the United Kingdom in Devon constituencies
Unopposed ministerial by-elections to the Parliament of the United Kingdom (need citation)
August 1916 events
1910s in Devon